Otterbach-Otterberg is a Verbandsgemeinde ("collective municipality") in the district Kaiserslautern, in Rhineland-Palatinate, Germany. The seat of the Verbandsgemeinde is in Otterberg. It was formed on 1 July 2014 by the merger of the former Verbandsgemeinden Otterbach and Otterberg.

The Verbandsgemeinde Otterbach-Otterberg consists of the following Ortsgemeinden ("local municipalities"):

 Frankelbach
 Heiligenmoschel
 Hirschhorn
 Katzweiler
 Mehlbach
 Niederkirchen
 Olsbrücken
 Otterbach
 Otterberg
 Schallodenbach
 Schneckenhausen
 Sulzbachtal

Verbandsgemeinde in Rhineland-Palatinate